Sir Lachlan Hector Charles Maclean of Duart and Morven, 12th Baronet, CVO, DL (born 25 August 1942) is the 28th chief of Clan Maclean.

Biography
Lachlan Hector Charles Maclean was born on 25 August 1942, the elder child of Charles Maclean (later created a life peer as Baron Maclean) and his wife, Elizabeth Mann. He was educated at Eton.

On 2 November 1966, he married Mary Helen Gordon (31 October 1943 – 30 December 2007), and the couple had five children. On the death of his father in 1990, he succeeded him as a Baronet of Nova Scotia and as Chief of the Name and Arms of Maclean. On 8 September 2010, he married Rosemary Matheson.

Honours
 Adjutant, Royal Company of Archers.
 Commissioned Deputy Lieutenant of Argyll and Bute (1993).
 Commander of the Royal Victorian Order (1999).

Issue
Emma Mary Maclean (b. 1967)
Sara Elizabeth Elen Maclean (1969–1971)
Malcolm Lachlan Charles Maclean, Younger of Duart and Morven (b. 1972)
Alexandra Caroline Maclean (b. 1975)
Andrew William Maclean (b. 1979)

Ancestry

Heraldry

References

1942 births
Baronets in the Baronetage of Nova Scotia
Lachlan Hector Charles
Commanders of the Royal Victorian Order
Deputy Lieutenants of Argyll and Bute
Living people
People educated at Eton College
Sons of life peers
Members of the Royal Company of Archers
Maclean, Lachlan, 8th Lord